Applied ecology is a sub-field within ecology that considers the application of the science of ecology to real-world (usually management) questions. It is also described as a scientific field that focuses on the application of concepts, theories, models, or methods of fundamental ecology to environmental problems.

Concept 
Applied ecology is an integrated treatment of the ecological, social, and biotechnological aspects of natural resource conservation and management. Applied ecology typically focuses on geomorphology, soils, and plant communities as the underpinnings for vegetation and wildlife (both game and non-game) management.

Applied ecology includes all disciplines that are related to human activities so that it does not only cover agriculture, forestry and fisheries but also global change. It has two study categories. The first involves the outputs or those fields that address the use and management of the environment, particularly for its ecosystem services and exploitable resources. The second are the inputs or those that are concerned with the management strategies or human influences on the ecosystem or biodiversity.

The discipline is often linked to ecological management on the grounds that the effective management of natural ecosystems depends on ecological knowledge. It often uses an ecological approach to solve problems of specific parts of the environment, which can involve the comparison of plausible options (e.g. best management options).

The role of applied science in agricultural production has been brought into greater focus as fluctuations in global food production feed through into prices and availability to consumers.

Approaches 
Applied ecologists often use one or more of the following approaches, namely, observation, experimentation, and modeling. For example, a wildlife preservation project could involve: observational studies of the wildlife ecology;  experiments to understand causal relationships; and the application of modeling to determine the information beyond the scope of experimentation.

The ecological approach used in applied ecology could include inputs from management strategies such as conservation biology, restoration ecology, global change, ecotoxicology, biomonitoring, biodiversity, environmental policies, and economics, among others. Restoration ecology is a particularly prominent strategy in the discipline since it applies the principles of restoring and repairing damaged ecological systems to their original state.

Like those used in ecological theory, many areas of the discipline employ approaches that are based on simple statistical and analytic models (e.g. spatial models) as well as those with mathematical properties (e.g. matrix models). There is also the digital computer simulation modeling, which is designed to solve statistical ecology problems and to achieve bioeconomic goals such as the forecasting and the evaluation of consequences for specific activities.

Applied ecology also requires human interest, particularly the exercise of judgments of relative values and goals.

Applications 
Applied ecology can be applied to the economic development process. The discipline, for example, can be integrated into the national economic planning to comprehensively address environmental concerns since these problems are intersectoral and interdisciplinary in nature.

Aspects of applied ecology include:

 Agro-ecosystem management
 Biodiversity conservation
 Biotechnology
 Conservation biology
Disturbance management
 Ecosystem restoration
Environmental engineering
 Environmental technology
 Habitat management
 Invasive species management
Landscape use (including development planning)
 Protected areas management
 Rangeland management
 Restoration ecology
Wildlife management (including game)

Major journals in the field include:

 Journal of Applied Ecology
 Ecological Applications
 Applied Ecology and Environmental Research

Related organizations include:
 Ecological Society of America (The Americas)
 Society for Ecological Restoration (Global)
 Institute for Applied Ecology (USA)
 Kazakh Agency of Applied Ecology
 Öko-Institut (Institute for Applied Ecology) (in Germany)

See also

Holistic management
Natural environment
Natural resource
Nature
Environmental impact design
Landscape planning

References

Bibliography

External links

Applied sciences
Bioremediation
Ecology
Ecological restoration
Environmental design
Sustainable urban planning
Environmental planning
Environmental technology
Horticulture
Landscape architecture